Public transport fares in the Île-de-France are set using a system of concentric fare zones radiating from central Paris, and are implemented with a mixture of paper and electronic tickets. Prices are determined by Île-de-France Mobilités, the regional autorité organisatrice de transports ("Regional Transport Organisational Authority"). As of January 2023, single tickets within Paris cost , and monthly passes covering all fare zones cost .

History 

In 1900, a second-class Paris Métro ticket cost 15 centimes of the old franc, and a first-class ticket 25 centimes. In 1960, it cost 37 centimes of the new franc. Six hundred million Métro tickets were sold that year, an average of around  a minute.

First class was abolished in 1991 on the Métro, and in 1999 on the rest of the railway network in the Île-de-France.

Zones 
The public transport network of Île-de-France Mobilités is divided into 5 zones. Zone 1 covers the city of Paris, and zones 2-5 surround it. Zone 5 covers Charles de Gaulle and Orly airports and Disneyland Paris.

Starting 1991, there were 8 zones. On 1 July 2007, zones 7 and 8 were merged into zone 6. On 1 July 2011, zone 6 was itself merged into zone 5. This was done to reduce transportation costs for residents of outer suburbs. On 11 February 2015, STIF (as Île-de-France Mobilités was then known) voted to discontinue passes covering zones 1–2, 1–3, and 1–4, leaving only passes covering all zones (and passes covering only zones outside zone 1).

Ticket types 
Île-de-France Mobilités sells several kinds of ticket. Single tickets are intended for occasional passengers. Combination and season tickets are aimed at regular travellers and those touring the region, and can be bought for various periods of validity. Tickets can be loaded onto "Navigo" smart cards, which come in various types, such as Navigo Easy for single and day tickets, and Navigo and Navigo Découverte for longer-term passes. Some tickets are also sold as paper tickets.

Single tickets

Ticket "t+" 

The Ticket "t+" is the most basic ticket in Île-de-France, allowing one journey on the Métro, the RER within zone 1, the tramways, the bus network, and the Montmartre furnicular. It allows for transfers between different buses and trams (but not Métro) within 90 minutes of its first validation. Children and other entitled users pay half-price for a carnet. and can be used on several modes of transport, with one or more interchanges. The time from the first validation of the ticket to the last must not exceed 90 minutes. However, it cannot be used to interchange between a Métro or RER line and the bus or tramway, nor between a Métro line and the Montmartre funicular. The paper version is in the process of being phased out, starting in October 2021 and continuing into 2023.

Île-de-France ticket
The fare depends on the distance travelled. It can be used in either direction between origin and destination, and allows the use of the Noctilien night bus network. The fare depends on the origin, destination and route and there are two fares: full fare or reduced fare. There is no limit to how far in advance a ticket can be purchased before being validated, but once validated they are valid for 2 hours only.

Combination and season tickets

Navigo
Navigo is a smartcard on which passes valid for a day, a week, a month, or a year may be loaded. Navigo cards are available to people living or working in Île-de-France, and have a photo of the user printed on them. Passes can be loaded with the following passes:

 A day pass (Forfait Navigo Jour), valid for one day within the chosen fare zones (between two and five zones). As of January 2023, the cheapest day ticket, valid for 2 zones (e.g. zones 1–2) costs , and a ticket for all zones (zones 1–5) costs . This ticket can also be loaded onto a Navigo Easy pass (which is not personalized), and an equivalent ticket is available at the same prices in paper form (Forfait Mobilis), on which name and date need to be written by hand before use. For people under 26 years old, a cheaper day pass is available on Saturdays and Sundays (Forfait Navigo Jeunes Week-end); this ticket was known as Ticket Jeunes (in paper form) until 2019.
The ticket can be purchased starting on Friday of the previous week (with its validity starting on Monday) until the Thursday of the week of validity (with validity ending on Sunday).
They are sold starting at the 20th of the prior month.
 An annual pass (Forfait Navigo Annuel), valid for 12 months starting from the first of a chosen month. Its monthly cost is the same as the Forfait Navigo Mois, but the 12th month is free. Annual passes are not available on the Navigo Découverte card.

For a journey to be valid, the pass must include all zones from the origin to the destination, including all zones passed through (even if no interchange is made there). Monthly and annual passes issued for two zones are valid for all zones on weekends, public holidays, and from mid-July to mid-August. The ticket can be used for any number of journeys on any form of public transport in the region (except Orlyval).

Prior to 2009, passes were sold on a carte orange with a magnetic strip. Until 2011, annual passes were previously sold under the name Carte Intégrale.

Carte Imagine'R 

The Carte Imagine'R is a ticket for students between 12 and 25 years of age. Valid for a year, it can be used on all modes of public transport in the region. Mondays to Fridays it can be used only in the zones assigned to the ticket, but at weekends and during public and school holidays the zones are relaxed and it can be used throughout the region. It also acts as a discount card in many large retailers and at other attractions.

Paris Visite

The Paris Visite is an all-day ticket aimed at tourists with four periods of validity: one, two, three or five consecutive days. It allows unlimited travel within the chosen zones (1–3 or 1–5) on all modes of transport – except the Filéo at Charles de Gaulle Airport, tourist buses, and Le Bus Direct services. Tickets for zones 1-5 allow travel to Charles de Gaulle and Orly airports. It is issued as a paper ticket, on which the traveller's name and the dates of validity must be written by hand before use.

Specialized tickets and discount cards

Forfait Antipollution 
It covers all modes of transport (except Orlyval) in zones 1–5, and is available as a paper ticket or can be loaded onto any Navigo card.

Carte Améthyste 

The Carte Améthyste is a discount card for the elderly and the disabled (aged over 20). It allows free travel on all modes of transport throughout the Île-de-France.

Carte Solidarité Transport 
The Carte Solidarité Transport is a discount card for those in great need, those on sickness benefits, those on unemployment benefits, single parents, and those earning the Revenu minimum d'insertion (RMI, a minimum earnings guarantee). It provides a discount of 50% on single tickets and 75% on monthly and weekly Carte orange tickets. The carte has a validity of one year and is intended for those in receipt of benefits. It is only available on demand, and exclusively by telephone (on a free call) through the Solidarité Transport agency.

Moreover, residents receiving Revenu de solidarité active (RSA, a form of social welfare) can use all of the road and rail network for free (except the Orlyval). Since 1 December 2008 this has also applied to those receiving the Allocation spécifique de solidarité, another benefit. Beneficiaries of RMI must renew their pass every three months, and the credits are automatically assigned to a Navigo pass or at a charging station.

See also 

 Transport in Paris

Notes

References

External links 

 Tickets and fares on the website of Île-de-France Mobilités.

Transport in Île-de-France
Fare collection systems in France